Christopher Peter Marks (born 17 July 1946) is a former English cricketer who played for Derbyshire from 1967 to 1969 and for Staffordshire  in the one-day game.

Marks was born at Hanley, Staffordshire. In 1964 he joined Derbyshire, and began playing in the Second XI. In the 1967 season he made his first-class debut in a match against the touring Indians, and his first County Championship match came a fortnight later against Gloucestershire. During Derbyshire's 1968 season, Marks was a frequent player with the team and he carried on into the 1969 season also playing second XI matches. In 1970 he joined Staffordshire and played one-day matches for the side in 1971 and 1973.
 
Marks was a right-handed batsman and played 21 innings in 14 first-class matches with an average of 11.36 and a top score of 39. He played one one-day match for Derbyshire and eight for Staffordshire. He was a right-arm medium-pace bowler and bowled 18 balls in the one day game for Staffordshire.

References

1946 births
English cricketers
Living people
Derbyshire cricketers
Staffordshire cricketers